Captain Hugh de Grey Seymour, 6th Marquess of Hertford  (22 October 1843 – 23 March 1912), styled Earl of Yarmouth from 1870 to 1884, was a British soldier, courtier and Conservative politician. He notably served as Comptroller of the Household between 1879 and 1880.

Background
A member of the Seymour family headed by the Duke of Somerset, Seymour was born in Dublin, Ireland, the eldest son of Francis Seymour, 5th Marquess of Hertford, by his wife Lady Emily Murray, daughter of David Murray, 3rd Earl of Mansfield. He was the grandson of Sir George Seymour and great-grandson of Lord Hugh Seymour and the nephew of George Seymour and Lady Laura Seymour. He became known by the courtesy title Earl of Yarmouth when his father succeeded to the marquessate of Hertford in 1870.

Military career
Seymour served in the Grenadier Guards, achieving the rank of captain. He was also Honorary Colonel of the Warwickshire Yeomanry and was awarded the Territorial Decoration. He was appointed an aide-de-camp to King Edward VII in the 1902 Coronation Honours list on 26 June 1902, with the regular rank of colonel. He served as such until the King's death in 1910, and was re-appointed ADC to King George V from 1910 until his own death in 1912.

Political career
Seymour was returned to parliament as one of two representatives for Antrim in 1869. At the 1874 general election he was returned for South Warwickshire, a seat he held until 1880. In 1879 he was sworn of the Privy Council and appointed Comptroller of the Household under Lord Beaconsfield, a post he retained until the government fell the following year. In 1884 he succeeded his father in the marquessate and entered the House of Lords.

In 1905 Lord Hertford was appointed Lord-Lieutenant of Warwickshire, which he remained until his death. He was also a Justice of the Peace for County Antrim. In 1906 he was appointed a Companion of the Order of the Bath (CB).

Family
Lord Hertford married the Honourable Mary Hood, daughter of Alexander Hood, 1st Viscount Bridport, on 16 April 1868. They had eight children:

Lady Margaret Alice Seymour (1869–1901), married shipowner James Hainsworth Ismay and had issue
George Francis Alexander Seymour, 7th Marquess of Hertford (1871–1940)
Lady Emily Mary Seymour (1873–1948), married Reverend Reginald Walker and had issue
Lady Victoria Frederica Wilhelmina Georgina Seymour (1874–1960), married Charles Trafford and had issue
Lady Jane Edith Seymour (1877–?), married Major Hugh Carleton
Brigadier-General Lord Henry Charles Seymour (1878–1939), married Lady Helen Grosvenor, a daughter of the 1st Duke of Westminster and had issue, including Hugh Seymour, 8th Marquess of Hertford
Lord Edward Beauchamp Seymour (1879–1917), married Elfrida de Trafford
Commander Lord George Frederick Seymour (1881–1940), married Norah Skipworth and had issue

The Marchioness of Hertford died in April 1909, aged 62, while on a voyage to Palestine. Lord Hertford died at Ragley Hall, Warwickshire, in March 1912, aged 68. He was succeeded in the marquessate by his eldest son, George.

References

External links 
 

1843 births
1912 deaths
Companions of the Order of the Bath
Lord-Lieutenants of Warwickshire
Members of the Privy Council of the United Kingdom
Yarmouth, Hugh Seymour, Earl of
Yarmouth, Hugh Seymour, Earl of
Yarmouth, Hugh Seymour, Earl of
Yarmouth, Hugh Seymour, Earl of
Yarmouth, Hugh Seymour, Earl of
Hertford, M6
Hugh
Military personnel from Dublin (city)
Warwickshire Yeomanry officers
British landowners
English justices of the peace
6
19th-century British businesspeople
Politicians from Dublin (city)